Smintopsini is a tribe of marsupial
in the family Dasyuridae.

Classification 

 Tribe Sminthopsini
 Genus Antechinomys
 Kultarr, Antechinomys laniger
 Genus Ningaui
 Wongai ningaui, Ningaui ridei
 Pilbara ningaui, Ningaui timealeyi
 Southern ningaui, Ningaui yvonnae
 Genus Sminthopsis
 S. crassicaudata species-group
 Fat-tailed dunnart, Sminthopsis crassicaudata
 S. macroura species-group
 Kakadu dunnart, Sminthopsis bindi
 Carpentarian dunnart, Sminthopsis butleri
 Julia Creek dunnart, Sminthopsis douglasi
 Stripe-faced dunnart, Sminthopsis macroura
 Red-cheeked dunnart, Sminthopsis virginiae
 S. granulipes species-group
 White-tailed dunnart, Sminthopsis granulipes
 S. griseoventer species-group
 Kangaroo Island dunnart, Sminthopsis aitkeni
 Boullanger Island dunnart, Sminthopsis boullangerensis
 Grey-bellied dunnart, Sminthopsis griseoventer
 S. longicaudata species-group
 Long-tailed dunnart, Sminthopsis longicaudata
 S. murina species-group
 Chestnut dunnart, Sminthopsis archeri
 Little long-tailed dunnart, Sminthopsis dolichura
 Sooty dunnart, Sminthopsis fulginosus
 Gilbert's dunnart, Sminthopsis gilberti
 White-footed dunnart, Sminthopsis leucopus
 Slender-tailed dunnart, Sminthopsis murina
 S. psammophila species-group
 Hairy-footed dunnart, Sminthopsis hirtipes
 Ooldea dunnart, Sminthopsis ooldea
 Sandhill dunnart, Sminthopsis psammophila
 Lesser hairy-footed dunnart, Sminthopsis youngsoni

References

Dasyuromorphs